Flagship Airlines Flight 3379 was a scheduled flight under the American Eagle branding from Piedmont Triad International Airport to Raleigh–Durham International Airport during which a British Aerospace Jetstream crashed while executing a missed approach to the Raleigh–Durham International Airport on the evening of Tuesday, December 13, 1994. The two pilots and 13 passengers died in the crash; five passengers survived with serious injuries.

Observers at the crash scene said it was foggy and sleeting.

Accident 
The crew for Flight 3379 were Captain Michael Hillis, 29, and First Officer Matthew Sailor, 25.

At 18:03, Flagship Airlines Flight 3379 took off from Greensboro, running late due to baggage loading. At 18:30, the flight was advised to turn left and join the localizer course at or above  for a runway 5L ILS approach.

Shortly after receiving clearance to land, the no. 1 engine ignition light illuminated in the cockpit as a result of a momentary negative torque condition when the propeller speed levers were advanced to 100% and the power levers were at flight idle. Captain Hillis suspected an engine flame-out and eventually decided to execute a missed approach.

The aircraft was manufactured in 1991 and had logged 6,577 flying hours.

Investigation 
On October 24, 1995, the National Transportation Safety Board (NTSB) released their report on the crash. The crash was blamed on Captain Hillis incorrectly assuming that an engine had failed. Hillis also failed to follow approved procedures for engine failure single-engine approach, go-around, and stall recovery. Flagship Airlines management was blamed for failing to identify, document, monitor, and remedy deficiencies in pilot performance and training.

Memorial 
In May 2016, a memorial was dedicated at Carpenter Park in Cary, NC, USA to the passengers, crew, families, and responders of both Flight 3379 and AVAir Flight 3378, which crashed near the RDU Airport while dba American Eagle in 1988.

In popular culture 
The crash was featured on season 22 of the Canadian documentary series Mayday, in the episode titled "Turboprop Terror".

References 

1994 in North Carolina
Accidents and incidents involving the British Aerospace Jetstream
Aviation accidents and incidents in the United States in 1994
Airliner accidents and incidents in North Carolina
Airliner accidents and incidents caused by pilot error
December 1994 events in the United States